Aesa was a town of ancient Macedonia. Aesa may also refer to:
 Aesa, a genus of beetles in the subfamily Prioninae

The acronym AESA may refer to:
 Active electronically scanned array
 American Educational Studies Association
 Spanish Aviation Safety and Security Agency, Agencia Española de Seguridad Aérea